Mbezi is an administrative ward in the Ubungo of the Dar es Salaam Region of Tanzania. In 2016 the Tanzania National Bureau of Statistics report there were 91,931 people in the ward, from 73,414 in 2012.

References

Wards of Dar es Salaam Region